José Luis Morales Martín (born 2 August 1973 in Madrid) is a Spanish former footballer who played as a forward.

Honours
Real Madrid
Copa Iberoamericana: 1994

External links

1973 births
Living people
Footballers from Madrid
Spanish footballers
Association football forwards
La Liga players
Segunda División players
Segunda División B players
Real Madrid C footballers
Real Madrid Castilla footballers
Real Madrid CF players
Sporting de Gijón players
RCD Mallorca players
CD Logroñés footballers
CD Numancia players
UD Salamanca players
Real Jaén footballers
Gimnástica de Torrelavega footballers
Palamós CF footballers
CD Móstoles footballers
Major League Soccer players
New England Revolution players
Primeira Liga players
C.D. Santa Clara players
Spain youth international footballers
Spain under-21 international footballers
Spanish expatriate footballers
Expatriate soccer players in the United States
Expatriate footballers in Portugal
Spanish expatriate sportspeople in the United States
Spanish expatriate sportspeople in Portugal